Lanao del Norte's 2nd congressional district is a congressional district in the province of Lanao del Norte that has been used in the House of Representatives of the Philippines since 1987. The district's boundaries have only been redrawn once, originally consisting of fifteen southern and interior municipalities, three of which bordered Panguil Bay and Moro Gulf, which were reduced to eleven municipalities following a reapportionment in November 2009. The district is currently represented in the 18th Congress by Abdullah D. Dimaporo of the Nationalist People's Coalition (NPC).

Representation history

Election results

2019

2016

2013

2010

See also
Legislative districts of Lanao del Norte

References

Congressional districts of the Philippines
Politics of Lanao del Norte
1987 establishments in the Philippines
Congressional districts of Northern Mindanao
Constituencies established in 1987